Mishipañahuin (possibly from Quechua mishi cat (misi, michi), ñawi eye, -pa, -n suffixes, a kind of potato or a name for the common bean) is a  mountain in the Andes of Peru. It is located in the Junín Region, Yauli Province, Marcapomacocha District. It lies northeast of Lake Marcapomacocha and at the shore of Lake Marcacocha.

References

Mountains of Peru
Mountains of Junín Region